Harold Arnaldo Castro (born November 30, 1993) is a Venezuelan professional baseball utility player in the Colorado Rockies organization. He has played in Major League Baseball (MLB) for the Detroit Tigers.

Career

Detroit Tigers

Minor leagues
Harold Castro was signed by the Tigers in 2010 as a 16-year-old. Castro spent 2011 and 2012 with the Tigers' Venezuelan summer league team, then a half-season with the Gulf Coast Rookie League team. In 2013, he played for the single-A West Michigan Whitecaps and single-A advanced Lakeland Flying Tigers, where he hit .245. He improved to a .286 average the next season, playing for the same two teams.

Castro spent the entirety of the 2015 and 2016 regular seasons, and all but eight games of 2017, with the Double-A Erie SeaWolves. Castro's 2017 with Erie was his best at the level. He hit for a .290 average, with a .325 on-base percentage, one home run, 30 RBI, and 20 stolen bases.

During the 2018 season, Castro spent 74 games with the Triple-A Toledo Mud Hens and hit for a .257 average with two home runs and 17 RBI. He also played 29 games with the SeaWolves, where he had a .282 average with ten RBI.

Major Leagues

2018
On September 21, 2018, the Tigers purchased Castro's minor league contract and added him to the roster after he had spent the last eight years in their minor league system. Since the Mud Hens season had already ended, Castro had to travel back to Detroit from his home in Venezuela.

He made his major league debut on September 23, as a pinch runner in the ninth inning of a game against the Kansas City Royals. He made his first MLB start on September 25, against the Minnesota Twins, where he recorded his first major league hit, a single in the top of the eighth inning. He went 3-for-10 (.300) in his brief 2018 stint with the Tigers. Castro was outrighted to Toledo on October 24 and elected free agency. He re-signed a minor league deal on October 31, 2018, with an invitation to spring training.

2019
Castro opened the 2019 season with Triple-A Toledo. On April 30, after hitting .353 for the Mud Hens, his contract was selected and he was recalled to the major league roster. He was optioned back to Toledo on May 13, then recalled again to the Tigers on June 4. On June 19, he hit his first career major league home run off Trevor Williams of the Pittsburgh Pirates. During the 2019 season, Castro played every fielding position except pitcher and catcher. In 354 at-bats for the Tigers, Castro hit .291 with 5 home runs and 38 RBI. Castro was named the 2019 Detroit Tigers Rookie of the Year in voting conducted by Detroit Sports Media association.

2020
To start off the 2020 season, Castro was expected to serve a bench role for the Tigers. Harold injured his hamstring and was placed on the injured list on August 19 (retroactive to the 18th). Overall with the 2020 Detroit Tigers, Castro batted .347 with no home runs and 3 RBIs in 22 games. He played all four infield and all three outfield positions.

2021
On March 27, 2021, the Tigers announced that Castro had made the team's opening day roster. On April 5, 2021, Castro was called on to pitch the ninth inning in a 15–6 loss against the Minnesota Twins. He needed nine pitches to get out of the inning, only allowing a walk. On May 15, Castro had his first career walk-off hit, with an RBI single that scored JaCoby Jones in the 10th inning of the Tigers 9–8 win over the Chicago Cubs. Castro played in 106 games during the 2021 season, hitting .283 with 3 home runs and 37 RBI.

2022
On March 22, 2022, Castro signed a one-year, $1.275 million contract with the Tigers, avoiding salary arbitration. In a May 25 game against the Minnesota Twins, Castro hit a pair of solo home runs for the first multi-homer game of his career. He finished the 2022 season with a team-leading .271 batting average along with career-highs in hits (114), home runs (7), doubles (21), RBI (47), runs (37) and walks (17). On November 18, Castro was non tendered by the Tigers and became a free agent.

Colorado Rockies
On January 19, 2023, Castro signed a minor league contract with the Colorado Rockies organization.

References

External links

1993 births
Detroit Tigers players
Erie SeaWolves players
Gulf Coast Tigers players
Lakeland Flying Tigers players
Leones del Caracas players
Living people
Major League Baseball infielders
Major League Baseball players from Venezuela
Baseball players from Caracas
Toledo Mud Hens players
Venezuelan Summer League Tigers players
West Michigan Whitecaps players
Venezuelan expatriate baseball players in the United States